Rhopalus is a genus of true bugs in the family Rhopalidae, the scentless plant bugs.

Species
 Rhopalus conspersus 
 Rhopalus distinctus 
 Rhopalus lepidus 
 Rhopalus maculatus 
 Rhopalus parumpunctatus 
 Rhopalus rufus 
 Rhopalus subrufus

Formerly listed as Rhopalus
 Rhopalus tigrinus reclassified as Brachycarenus tigrinus

References

External links
 Biolib
 Rhopalus Schilling 1827 Fauna Europaea

Hemiptera of Europe
Rhopalini
Pentatomomorpha genera